Deborah Ann Peel is a female former athlete who competed for England.

Athletics career
Peel was a three times National champion after winning the 1982, 1983 and 1984 AAA National Championships in the 3,000 metres.

She represented England in the 3,000 metres, at the 1982 Commonwealth Games in Brisbane, Queensland, Australia. Four years later she represented England again in the 3,000 metres event again, at the 1986 Commonwealth Games in Edinburgh, Scotland.

References

English female middle-distance runners
Athletes (track and field) at the 1982 Commonwealth Games
Athletes (track and field) at the 1986 Commonwealth Games
Commonwealth Games competitors for England